Fluoroaspirin is the fluoroacetate ester of salicylic acid. It's the fluoroacetate analog of aspirin. Like other fluoroacetate esters, fluoroaspirin is highly toxic.

See also
Methyl fluoroacetate
Fluoroethyl fluoroacetate

References

Fluoroacetates
Salicylic acids
Salicylyl esters